Nik Henigman (born 4 December 1995) is a Slovenian handball player for Saint-Raphaël Var Handball and the Slovenian national team.

He participated at the 2016 Summer Olympics in Rio de Janeiro, in the men's handball tournament.

References

External links

1995 births
Living people
Handball players from Ljubljana
Slovenian male handball players
Olympic handball players of Slovenia
Handball players at the 2016 Summer Olympics
Expatriate handball players
Slovenian expatriate sportspeople in Hungary
Slovenian expatriate sportspeople in France
SC Pick Szeged players